Mikhail Aleksandrovich Mokhnatkin (born 16 January 1990) is a Russian Combat Sambo and mixed martial arts practitioner. He is a World and European Champion in 100 kg. In mixed martial arts, Mokhnatkin leads 11–2–2 by fights.

He is married to world-class sambist Marina Mokhnatkina.

Mixed martial arts record

|-
| Win
| align=center| 14–5–2
|Vinicius Moreira
|Decision (unanimous)
|Open Fighting Championship 15
|
|align=center|3
|align=center|5:00
|Moscow, Russia
|
|-
| Win
| align=center| 13–5–2
|Ricardo Prasel
|Decision (unanimous)
|UAE Warriors 22
|
|align=center|3
|align=center|5:00
|Abu Dhabi, United Arab Emirates
|
|-
| Win
| align=center| 12–5–2
| Fábio Marongiu
| TKO (punches)
| Leon Warriors: Stage 1
| 
| align=center| 1
| align=center| 4:06
| Minsk, Belarus
| 
|-
| Loss
| align=center| 11–5–2
| Maxim Grishin
|KO (punch)
|PFL 6
|
|align=center|1
|align=center|0:48
|Atlantic City, New Jersey, United States
| 
|-
| Loss
| align=center| 11–4–2
| Rashid Yusupov
| Decision (unanimous)
| PFL 3
| 
| align=center| 3
| align=center| 5:00
| Long Island, New York, United States
| 
|-
| Loss
| align=center| 11–3–2
| Francimar Barroso
|Decision (unanimous)
|RCC 5
|
|align=center|3
|align=center|5:00
|Ekaterinburg, Russia
|
|-
| Win
| align=center| 11–2–2
| Kleber Silva
| TKO (retirement)
| RCC 3
| 
| align=center| 1
| align=center| 5:00
| Yekaterinburg, Russia
|
|-
| Win
| align=center| 10–2–2
|Derrick Mehmen
| Decision (unanimous)
| Fight Nights Global 75: Deák vs. Chistyakov
| 
| align=center| 3
| align=center| 5:00
| Saint Petersburg, Russia
| 
|-
| Loss
| align=center| 9–2–2
| Sergei Pavlovich
|Decision (unanimous)
|Fight Nights Global 68
|
|align=center|5
|align=center|5:00
|St. Petersburg, Russia
|
|-
| Win
| align=center| 9–1–2
| Fábio Maldonado
|Decision (unanimous)
|Fight Nights Global 52: Mokhnatkin vs. Maldonado
|
|align=center|3
|align=center|5:00 
|Nizhnevartovsk, Russia
| 
|-
| Draw
| align=center| 8–1–2
| Alexei Kudin
| Draw
| Fight Nights Global 46: Mokhnatkin vs. Kudin
| 
| align=center|3
| align=center|5:00
| Krylatskoe, Russia
|
|-
| Win
| align=center| 8–1–1
| Ednaldo Oliveira
| Submission (scarf hold armlock)
|Fight Nights Global 42
| 
| align=center| 1
| align=center| 4:50
| St. Petersburg, Russia
|
|-
| Win
| align=center|7–1–1
| Donald Njatah Nya
| Submission (rear-naked choke)
| Fight Nights Global 40
| 
| align=center| 2
| align=center| 4:34
| Sochi, Russia
|
|-
| Draw
| align=center|6–1–1
| Jiří Procházka
| Draw (majority)
| Fight Nights Global 29
| 
| align=center|3
| align=center|5:00
| Moscow, Russia
|
|-
| Win
| align=center| 6–1
| Evgeni Guryanov
| TKO (punches)
| Fight Nights Global 27
| 
|align=Center|1
|align=center|1:03
| Moscow, Russia
| 
|-
| Win
| align=center| 5–1
| Pavel Tretyakov
| TKO (punches)
| Fight Nights Global 26
|
|align=Center|1
|align=center|1:42
|Moscow, Russia
| 
|-
| Win
| align=center| 4–1
| Valentijn Overeem
| TKO (submission to strikes)
| Fight Nights Global 22
| 
| align=center| 1
| align=center| 4:45
| Moscow, Russia
| 
|-
| Win
| align=center| 3–1
| Nikolai Alexiev
| Submission (rear-naked choke)
| S-70: Plotforma Cup 2013
| 
| align=center| 3
| align=center| 3:38
| Sochi, Russia
| 
|-
| Win
| align=center| 2–1
| Igor Sliusarchuk
| Submission (rear-naked choke)
| Global Fight Club 2
| 
| align=center| 1
| align=center| 3:03
| Krasnodar, Russia
| 
|-
| Win
| align=center| 1–1
| Artur Astakhov
| Decision (unanimous)
| Lion's Fights 1
| 
| align=center| 2
| align=center| 5:00
| St. Petersburg, Russia
|
|-
| Loss
| align=center| 0–1
| Murad Chachanov
| Submission (rear-naked choke)
| L-1: Marshal Govorov Memorial 2010
| 
| align=center| 1
| align=center| 1:20
| St. Petersburg, Russia
|

References

1990 births
Living people
Sportspeople from Leningrad Oblast
Russian sambo practitioners
Russian male mixed martial artists
Mixed martial artists utilizing sambo
20th-century Russian people
21st-century Russian people